Emil Bodnăraș (10 February 1904 – 24 January 1976) was a Romanian communist politician, an army officer, and a Soviet agent, who had considerable influence in the Romanian People's Republic.

Early life
Bodnăraș was born to a Ukrainian father and a German mother in 1904, in Iaslovăț, Suceava County, Bukovina, then under Austro-Hungarian rule. His career as an artillery officer in the Romanian army was interrupted by a conflict with a member of the Romanian Royal House. He was transferred to a garrison in Bessarabia where he was contacted by Communist elements, became a Soviet spy and defected to the USSR in 1931. He returned to Romania in 1935 and fulfilled different special missions for Soviet military intelligence. Caught by accident, Bodnăraș was sentenced to ten years in prison. Imprisoned at Brașov, Doftana, and Caransebeș, he entered the Romanian Communist Party in 1940, becoming a key figure in Gheorghe Gheorghiu-Dej's faction. He was released in 1942.

Arrest and the leadership entry of the RCP
In 1935, Bodnăraș returned illegally to Romania to carry out special missions entrusted by the Main Intelligence Directorate (GRU) - Soviet foreign military-intelligence agency. However, he was recognized on the train and denounced by one of his former schoolmates. In May 1935 he was sentenced to 10 years of hard work for deserting in time of peace, theft of official acts and crimes against state security. After re-judging, the sentence was reduced to only five years of imprisonment. He was imprisoned in Aiud, Galați, Brașov, Doftana, and Caransebeș. At Doftana Prison he became friends with Gheorghiu-Dej, and in 1940 he became a member of the RCP.

Being in Brașov Prison, Bodnăraș learned that he had lost Romanian citizenship, being a civil servant in the Soviet Union. "In Brașov prison I got the USSR citizenship through an official communication made by the Soviet embassy, on the basis of a request that my brother made to the embassy on my behalf. Being a Soviet citizen in those years was advantageous, a citizen of Romania who received Soviet citizenship was a person with whom it was not advisable to be violent or to beat", explained Bodnăraș personally in a stenograph in 1952.

On November 7, 1942, he was released from the prison in Caransebeș, at the request of the SSI (Romanian Intelligence Service). Upon release, "the comrades also gave me a large amount of money, 50,000 lei, which I hid in a box to be sent to my brother with my clothes and things, and personally, I held 10,000 lei. At that time it was a lot of money". He paid 8,000 lei to the security commissioner who issued the documents, to convince him to go over the detail of the Soviet citizenship, which - according to the law - led to the placement in the camp.<ref name="Antena 3_ He arrived in Galați, where he was sheltered by his brother, Manole. When released, Bodnăraș joined the "national" fraction of Gheorghe Gheorghiu-Dej. The rest of the money he used to organize - for two years - a lime, cement, and tile business, based in Galați, which allowed him to trip freely through the country, although he was supervised by the Intelligence Service. In Bucharest, Bodnăraș used to get information from an agent named Kendler, a timber trader who - at Bodnaraș's order - paid 30,000 lei per month to Colonel Enache Borcescu, member of the General Staff of the Army, for information on Romanian and German troops movements. The common place of meetings between Kendler and Borcescu was a Greek Catholic church in Bucharest (according to an interview made by Dennis Deletant with Traian Borcescu, on March 8, 1995). He also arrived at Târgu Jiu, where, simulating an "appendicitis cramps" attack, was hospitalized in the same hospital room with a "sick" patient Gheorghiu-Dej. There, the maneuvers for the annihilation of the RCP's secretariat led by Ștefan Foriș, were drafted; also, the alliance plans were made to create a national front and the decision on Dej's escape was adopted.<ref name="Antena 3_

1944–1947
In 1944, Bodnăraș (together with Iosif Rangheț and Constantin Pîrvulescu) was a key participant in the political elimination and physical isolation of Ștefan Foriș, the General Secretary of the Party. The three of them dominated the leadership of the Party until Dej's escape from prison, in August of the same year. After the massive bombing of Bucharest on 4 April 1944, Bodnăraș and Rangheț captured Foriș and forced him to sign his deposition at gunpoint.

Bodnăraș participated in the 23 August 1944 coup led by King Michael I against the government of Ion Antonescu. He organized underground paramilitary units and coordinated the weakening of a segment of the Moldavian front called "Poarta Iașiului" against the Soviet offensive of August 1944.  He was part of a group of communists who took custody of Ion Antonescu after his arrest, and locked him together with Mihai Antonescu in a safe house, before handing them to the Red Army troops.

He became a member of the Romanian Politburo. During March 1945 and November 1947 he became secretary-general of the "Council of Ministers"' presidency, being in charge of secret intelligence services. From this position he was one of the orchestrators of the electoral fraud of 1946 and of the Tămădău Affair.

His enormous influence was due to permanent direct contact with the Soviet secret services (he was reporting on each of the Romanian Communist Party leaders, as revealed later on in the case of Ana Pauker).

Under Gheorghiu-Dej
He held two important positions under Gheorghiu-Dej: Minister of Defense and Vice Premier. On 27 December 1947 he became Minister of Defense, taking over the position previously held by Mihail Lascăr. He held this office until 3 October 1955, while in 1956 he became Minister of Transportation. During his tenure, a Sovietization of the Romanian Army occurred. Bodnăraș sent several Romanian Communists to Moscow to be trained in a special military school, among them the young Nicolae Ceaușescu, who became a close and zealous collaborator and was appointed general and political commissar of the military forces.

He remained one of Gheorghiu-Dej's supporters until Dej's death, and he resisted the restructurations of the Party proposed by Iosif Chișinevschi and Miron Constantinescu.

During the Hungarian Revolution of 1956, Bodnăraș led a body authorized to intervene and open fire in crisis situations. In November, together with Gheorghiu-Dej, he headed up the Romanian delegation visiting  Hungary, which held discussions with János Kádár about the support of the suppression of the Hungarian revolution. It seems he also had a key role in influencing Nikita Khrushchev's decision to withdraw the Red Army from Romania in 1958. According to Khrushchev's memoirs, Bodnăraș proposed the withdrawal of the troops at a time which was not in consideration of by the Soviet leaders, while they were expected to stay until the end of the Cold War.

After Gheorghiu-Dej's death in March 1965, Bodnăraș, as one of the most influential members of the Politburo, decided to support Ceaușescu instead of Gheorghe Apostol or Alexandru Drăghici, thus facilitating Ceaușescu's ascension to the position of General Secretary of the Party.

Under Ceaușescu
Bodnăraș transferred his loyalty to Ceaușescu, receiving in exchange the position of vice president of the State Council, and he remained a member of the Communist élite until his death. The town of Milișăuți was renamed Emil Bodnăraș from 7 September 1976 to 20 May 1996.

Notes

References

 Final Report of the Presidential Commission for the Study of the Communist Dictatorship in Romania
 Lavinia Betea, "Bodnăraș – cetățean sovietic" ("Bodnăraș – Soviet citizen") in Jurnalul Național, October 4, 2005
 Cristina Arvatu, "Răfuială cu șeful in stil gangsteresc" ("Settling accounts with the boss in gangster style"), in Jurnalul Național, October 5, 2005
 Lavinia Betea, "'Sforarul' Bodnăraș și lecția crimei politice" ("The Schemer Bodnăraș and the Lesson of Political Crime"), in Adevărul, August 22, 2011
 Vartan Arachelian, "Falsificatorii" ("The deceivers"), in Ziua, August 23, 2005
 Miron Vasile, "Bodnăraș uneltește, la Palat, deschiderea frontului prin 'Poarta Iașiului'", in Historia, August 2004
 Teofil Oroian, "Scurta cronica a consilierilor (1948/1949 – 1959/1960)" ("Soviet counsellors in the Romanian army: A brief historical perspective"), in Dosarele Istoriei, December 2003
Biljana Vankovska, Håkan Wiberg, Between past and future: civil-military relations in the post-communist Balkans, I. B. Tauris, 2003, 
Ion Mihai Pacepa, Red Horizons: The True Story of Nicolae and Elena Ceaușescu's Crimes, Lifestyle, and Corruption, Regnery Publishing, 1990, 
 Cristina Scorțariu, "Repunerea pe soclu a lui Bodnăraș aduce nemulțumiri în rândul istoricilor", in Informația, August 13, 2003
 Minister of Defense's photo album – Bodnăraș Emil

1904 births
1976 deaths
People from Suceava County
People from the Duchy of Bukovina
Austro-Hungarian people
Ukrainian Austro-Hungarians
General Secretaries of the Romanian Communist Party
Inmates of Doftana prison
Romanian Land Forces generals
State Council of Romania
Deputy Prime Ministers of Romania
Romanian Ministers of Defence
Members of the Chamber of Deputies (Romania)
Romanian people of World War II
Recipients of the Order of the Star of the Romanian Socialist Republic
Romanian people of Ukrainian descent
Inmates of Aiud prison
Soviet spies
Incarcerated spies
People convicted of spying for the Soviet Union
Collaborators with the Soviet Union